Arturo García Portillo (born 22 November 1966) is a Mexican politician from the National Action Party. From 2009 to 2012 he served as Deputy of the LXI Legislature of the Mexican Congress representing Chihuahua.

References

1966 births
Living people
Politicians from Chihuahua (state)
National Action Party (Mexico) politicians
21st-century Mexican politicians
Deputies of the LXI Legislature of Mexico
Members of the Chamber of Deputies (Mexico) for Chihuahua (state)